Guy Forget and Jakob Hlasek defeated Sergio Casal and Emilio Sánchez in the final, 6–4, 7–6(7–5), 5–7, 6–4 to win the doubles tennis title at the 1990 ATP Tour World Championships.

Jim Grabb and Patrick McEnroe were the reigning champions, but did not compete this year.

Draw

Finals

Group A
Standings are determined by: 1. number of wins; 2. number of matches; 3. in two-players-ties, head-to-head records; 4. in three-players-ties, percentage of sets won, or of games won; 5. steering-committee decision.

Group B
Standings are determined by: 1. number of wins; 2. number of matches; 3. in two-players-ties, head-to-head records; 4. in three-players-ties, percentage of sets won, or of games won; 5. steering-committee decision.

External links
ATP Tour World Championships Doubles Draw

Doubles
Tennis tournaments in Australia
1990 in Australian tennis
Sports competitions on the Gold Coast, Queensland
Tennis in Queensland